The 1970 Rothmans Canadian Open was a tennis tournament played on outdoor clay courts at the Toronto Cricket Skating and Curling Club in Toronto in Canada that was part of the 1970 Pepsi-Cola Grand Prix. The men's tournament was held from August 12 through August 18, 1970, while the women's tournament was played from August 19 through August 25, 1970.

Finals

Men's singles
 Rod Laver defeated  Roger Taylor 6–0, 4–6, 6–3
 It was Laver's 6th professional title of the year and the 17th of his career.

Women's singles
 Margaret Court defeated  Rosemary Casals 6–8, 6–4, 6–4
 It was Court's 27th professional title of the year and the 77th of her career.

Men's doubles
 William Bowrey /  Marty Riessen defeated  Cliff Drysdale /  Fred Stolle 6–3, 6–2
 It was Bowrey's 2nd title of the year and the 4th of his career. It was Riessen's 3rd title of the year and the 8th of his professional career.

Women's doubles
 Rosemary Casals /  Margaret Court defeated  Evonne Goolagong /  Pat Walkden 6–0, 6–1
 It was Casals' 6th title of the year and the 13th of her career. It was Court's 28th professional title of the year and the 78th of her career.

References

External links
 
 Association of Tennis Professionals (ATP) tournament profile
 Women's Tennis Association (WTA) tournament profile

Rothmans Canadian Open
Canadian Open (tennis)
Rothmans Canadian Open
Rothmans Canadian Open
Canadian Open